Maturino da Firenze (1490–1528) was an Italian painter, born in Florence, but working in Rome during the Renaissance.

Vasari described the relationship between Polidoro da Caravaggio and Maturino as exceedingly close: 

Vasari did not distinguish between the two painters in the joint works of Polidoro and Maturino Dr. Evelina Borea, in her recent study on Polidoro, considers the contribution of the Florentine painter, Maturino, to be minimal.

Most sources say he died ca.1528, but some say he was killed in the Sack of Rome the previous year.

Notes

External links
Giorgio Vasari, Vita of Polidoro da Caravaggio

1490 births
1528 deaths
16th-century Italian painters
Italian male painters
Painters from Florence
Italian Renaissance painters